Zdeněk Štěpánek (22 September 1896 – 20 June 1968) was a Czech actor. He appeared in 65 films between 1922 and 1968.

Selected filmography

 St. Wenceslas (1930)
 Paradise Road (1936)
 The World Is Ours (1937)
 Skeleton on Horseback (1937)
 Virginity (1937)
 The Merry Wives (1938)
 Muž z neznáma (1939)
 The Magic House (1939)
 Second Tour (1940)
 Experiment (1943)
 Mist on the Moors (1943)
 Rozina, the Love Child (1945)
 The Adventurous Bachelor (1946)
 Sign of the Anchor (1947)
 Lost in the Suburbs (1948)
 Císařův pekař a pekařův císař (1951)
 The Secret of Blood (1953)
 Jan Hus (1954)
 Dog's Heads (1955)
 Jan Žižka (1955)
 Against All (1956)
 The Flood (1958)
 Today for the Last Time (1958)
 Fetters (1961)
 Hvězda zvaná Pelyněk (1964)
 Hands Up, Or I'll Shoot (1966/2009)

References

External links

1896 births
1968 deaths
Czech male film actors
Czech male stage actors
Czech male television actors
People from Benešov District
Burials at Vyšehrad Cemetery
Czechoslovak Legion personnel
Austro-Hungarian military personnel of World War I
Czech theatre directors